35th National Board of Review Awards
December 22, 1963
The 35th National Board of Review Awards were announced on December 22, 1963.

Top ten films 
Tom Jones
Lilies of the Field
All the Way Home
Hud
This Sporting Life
Lord of the Flies
The L-Shaped Room
The Great Escape
How the West Was Won
The Cardinal

Top foreign films 
8½
The Four Days of Naples
Winter Light
The Leopard
Any Number Can Win

Winners 
Best Film: Tom Jones
Best Foreign Film: 8½
Best Actor: Rex Harrison (Cleopatra)
Best Actress: Patricia Neal (Hud)
Best Supporting Actor: Melvyn Douglas (Hud)
Best Supporting Actress: Margaret Rutherford (The V.I.P.s)
Best Director: Tony Richardson (Tom Jones)

External links 
National Board of Review of Motion Pictures :: Awards for 1963

1963
National Board of Review Awards
National Board of Review Awards
National Board of Review Awards
National Board of Review Awards